Ingolf Wiegert (born 3 November 1957 in Magdeburg) is a former East German handball player who competed in the 1980 Summer Olympics.

He was a member of the East German handball team which won the gold medal. He played all six matches and scored ten goals.

External links
profile

1957 births
Living people
German male handball players
Handball players at the 1980 Summer Olympics
Olympic handball players of East Germany
Olympic gold medalists for East Germany
Olympic medalists in handball
Medalists at the 1980 Summer Olympics
Sportspeople from Magdeburg